Darrell Lamond Taylor (born March 24, 1997) is an American football outside linebacker for the Seattle Seahawks of the National Football League (NFL). He played college football at Tennessee.

Early life and high school
Taylor grew up in Hopewell, Virginia and attended Hopewell High School, where he played football. Rated a four-star recruit, Taylor committed to play college football at the University of Tennessee over offers from Florida and Virginia Tech.

College career
Taylor played at the University of Tennessee from 2015–2019 under coaches Butch Jones and Jeremy Pruitt. Taylor redshirted his true freshman season. As a redshirt freshman, he made nine tackles (one for loss) in eight games played. Taylor missed two games of his redshirt sophomore year due to a suspension for an altercation with a teammate. He finished the season with 27 tackles, four tackles for loss, three sacks and two forced fumbles. As a redshirt junior, Taylor led the team with eight sacks and 11 tackles for loss with 36 total tackles.

Taylor entered his redshirt senior year on the Chuck Bednarik Award watchlist. Taylor finished the season tied for second in the SEC with 8.5 sacks and led the Volunteers with 10 tackles for loss along with 46 total tackles, a forced fumble, a fumble recovery and four passes defended. Taylor finished his collegiate career with 118 tackles, 26.5 tackles for loss, and 19.5 sacks with six forced fumbles, four fumble recoveries and seven passes defended in 38 games.

Professional career

Taylor was invited to the NFL Scouting Combine, but did not participate in any drills due to an offseason surgery. Taylor was selected by the Seattle Seahawks in the second round with the 48th pick in the 2020 NFL Draft. He was placed on the active/non-football injury list at the start of training camp on August 3, 2020. He was moved to the reserve/non-football injury list at the start of the regular season on September 5, 2020. He returned to practice on January 5, 2021, but the team did not activate him before the end of the season. 

On October 17, 2021, in a Sunday Night Football game against the Pittsburgh Steelers, Taylor suffered what appeared to be a serious neck/head injury, and left the field injured on a stretcher under medical care. After the game, the Seahawks confirmed that Taylor had feeling in all of his extremities and that he was expected to fly back to Seattle with the rest of his team. He appeared in 16 games, of which he started five, as a rookie. He finished with 6.5 sacks, 37 total tackles (28 solo), one pass defensed, and one forced fumble.

References

External links

Seattle Seahawks bio
Tennessee Volunteers bio

1997 births
Living people
People from Hopewell, Virginia
Players of American football from Virginia
American football linebackers
American football defensive ends
Tennessee Volunteers football players
Seattle Seahawks players